Jorge Head (born 27 July 1949) is a Spanish diver. He competed in the men's 10 metre platform event at the 1972 Summer Olympics.

References

1949 births
Living people
Spanish male divers
Olympic divers of Spain
Divers at the 1972 Summer Olympics
Place of birth missing (living people)